Richard T. Bissen Jr. (born February 28, 1962) is an American politician, retired jurist, and Mayor of Maui County. 

In 2005, Bissen was nominated by Governor Linda Lingle to serve as a judge for the second judicial circuit. He was renominated for his judgeship by Governor David Ige in 2015, and retired from the judiciary in December of 2021. 

In January 2022, Bissen announced his candidacy for Mayor of Maui County. Bissen placed first in the primaries, receiving approximately 34.7 percent of the vote, with incumbent Mike Victorino finishing in second place. Maui County elections are non-partisan, with the top two candidates moving on to the general election. Bissen defeated Victorino in the general election, receiving approximately 61.4 percent of the vote.

References 

Living people

1962 births
Native Hawaiian politicians
American jurists